Maola Milk & Ice Cream Company, Inc. was a dairy company located in New Bern, North Carolina, United States. During its operation, products were distributed throughout North Carolina as well as parts of South Carolina and Virginia including milk, ice cream, juices, custard and novelties. The company was purchased by Maryland & Virginia Milk Producers Cooperative Association, Inc., currently based in Herndon, Virginia, in 2003. While the New Bern processing plant was closed in 2014, fluid milk is still actively processed and distributed to consumers under the brand of "Maola Local Dairies."

History
Maola was founded in Washington, North Carolina and has made milk and ice cream since 1935. The company produces 100,000 gallons of milk per day and sells 1.5 million gallons of ice cream annually.

The processing plant in New Bern closed in 2014 after 79 years of production. Maola branded products are now made at facilities in High Point, North Carolina, Landover, Maryland, and Newport News, Virginia.

References

External links
Maola Local Dairies (Official Website)

Dairy farming
New Bern, North Carolina
Food and drink companies established in 1935
1935 establishments in North Carolina